Truman Road, Truman, or 15th Street is a major east/west road in Jackson County, Missouri. It serves Kansas City, Missouri, Independence, and eastern unincorporated Jackson County.

Its western terminus is at Broadway Boulevard and I-670 in downtown Kansas City, and its eastern terminus is at the Jackson/Lafayette County line when concurrent with Route FF, north of Oak Grove.

It is named after Harry S. Truman, the 33rd U.S. President, and runs through his hometown of Independence.

Leaving Kansas City to the east, Truman Road follows Route 12 from Interstate 435, which was originally called Blue Avenue, after the Blue River and Blue Summit unincorporated community which it passed, then to an intersection with Spring Street on the Independence Square, .. Along this stretch is Van Horn High School, the Maywood Business District, and The Truman home.

Truman Road east of Route 291 in Independence was originally called Spring Branch Road, after the nearby creek. Out here is an intersection with Route 78/Lake City-Buckner Road, as well as a bridge crossing over the Little Blue River. With the proposed extensions of Jackson Drive and the Little Blue Parkway north of 39th Street as well as future development, this stretch of Truman Road is due for upgrades, such as converting from two lanes to four.

15th Street, Blue Avenue, and Spring Branch Road were later renamed "Van Horn Road" for Robert T. Van Horn, in his honor, who purchased the newspaper The Enterprise in 1856 and renamed it The Kansas City Journal, was a member of the board of aldermen in 1857; postmaster of Kansas City 1857–1861; elected Kansas City mayor for three terms in 1861, 1863, and 1864.

The Truman Road corridor is served by two principal tax exempt entities and is serviced by the City of Kansas City, MO, with other sub-organizational entities in sections along the corridor.  The Truman Road Community Improvement District (CID) is a 501(c)(4) non-profit dedicated to investing in community infrastructure and improvements along the corridor as a sub-governmental entity largely tasked with common areas in and/or surrounding East Truman Road. The East Truman Road corridor as a whole is a major thoroughfare on the Eastern side of Downtown Kansas City, Missouri.

References

Streets in Kansas City, Missouri
Transportation in Kansas City, Missouri